This is a list of notable people associated with the U.S. state of Oregon through birth and/or residence.

A

 Bruce Abbott (born 1954) – actor
 Kenneth Acker (born 1992) – cornerback for the San Francisco 49ers
 Duane Ackerson (1942–2020) – poet
 Brock Adams (1927–2004) – U.S. Representative and Senator from Washington
 Alvin P. Adams Jr. (1942–2015) – diplomat
 Lucia H. Faxon Additon (1847-1919) – writer, teacher, social reformer
 Obo Addy (1936–2012) – worldbeat musician
 Brad Adkins (born 1973) – artist
 Robert H. Adleman (1919–1995) – novelist, historian and restaurateur
 Danny Ainge (born 1959) – former National Basketball Association and Major League Baseball player, NBA executive
 Erik Ainge (born 1986) – New York Jets quarterback, and nephew of Danny Ainge
 Jerome Alden (1921–1997) – playwright and screenwriter
 Art Alexakis (born 1962) – member of Everclear
 James H. Allen (1928–2015) – clown, author
 Laura Allen (born 1974) – actress
 Ryan Allen (born 1990) – punter for the New England Patriots
 Goli Ameri (born 1956) – U.S. Assistant Secretary of State for Educational and Cultural Affairs
 Rachel Ames (born 1929) – actress
 Aminé (born 1994) – hip hop musician and rapper
 Bob Amsberry (1928–1957) – actor
 David Anders (born 1981) – actor
Larry Andersen (born 1962) – former Major League Baseball pitcher
Bruce Anderson (born 1944) – former National Football League linebacker
 Derek Anderson (born 1983) – quarterback for the Carolina Panthers
 Scott Anderson (born 1962) – former Major League Baseball pitcher
 Andy Andrist (born 1965) – stand-up comedian
 Oliver Cromwell Applegate (1845–1938) – politician
 James E. Atwater (born 1946) – scientist; 2006 Wright Brothers medalist
 Montgomery Atwater (1904–1976) – author, skier, avalanche control expert
 Les AuCoin (born 1942) — retired US Congressman, 1st Dist., 1974–1992, Oregon State House Majority Leader, 1973—74
 Jean M. Auel (born 1936) – author
 Thomas J. Autzen (1888–1958) – namesake of University of Oregon's stadium, contributing engineer to plywood manufacturing technologies

B

 Charlie Babb (1873–1954) – Major League Baseball shortstop
 Wally Backman (born 1959) – Major League Baseball second baseman, Oregon Sports Hall of Fame inductee 
 Preston Bailey (born 2000) – actor
Rex T. Barber (1917–2001) – World War II fighter pilot; known for shooting down Isoroku Yamamoto
 Carl Barks (1901–2001) – comic book writer and artist
 Jeffrey Barry (born 1969) – former Major League Baseball outfielder
 Blanche Bates (1873–1941) – stage and film actress
 Scott Beach (1931–1996) – actor
 Terry Bean – co-founder of the Human Rights Campaign and Democratic National Committee member
 James Beard (1903–1985) – chef and food journalist
 Austin Bibens-Dirkx (born 1985) – relief pitcher for the Texas Rangers
 Josh Bidwell (born 1976) – former NFL punter 
 Mel Blanc (1908–1989) – voice actor
 Sheila Bleck (born 1974) – IFBB professional bodybuilder
 Lynette Boggs (born 1963) – politician, attorney, author, Miss Oregon 1989
 Harry D. Boivin (1904–1999) – lawyer and legislative leader
 Tracy Bonham (born 1967) – alternative rock musician
 William H. Boring (1841–1932) – Civil War veteran, pioneer
 Kevin Boss (born 1984) – tight end for the Kansas City Chiefs
 Chris Botti (born 1962) – trumpeter, recording artist
 Grayson Boucher (born 1984) – basketball player in the Streetball Mix Tape Tour
 Bill Bowerman (1911–1999) – track coach at University of Oregon, Nike co-founder
 Matt Braunger (born 1974) – actor and stand-up comedian
 Ronnie Brewer (born 1985) – player for the Chicago Bulls
 Greg Brock (born 1957) – former Major League Baseball player for the Los Angeles Dodgers and Milwaukee Brewers
 Meredith Brooks (born 1958) – musician
 Scott Brosius (born 1966) – former Major League Baseball third baseman for the Oakland A's and New York Yankees
 Jasmin Savoy Brown (born 1994) – actress
 Bill Brown (1855–1941) – pioneer horse and sheep rancher
 Kate Brown (born 1960) – Spanish-born politician, 38th and current Governor of Oregon
 Brian Bruney (born 1982) – former Major League Baseball relief pitcher 
 Louise Bryant (1885–1936) – journalist and writer
 Edgar Buchanan (1903–1979) – actor
 Peter Buck (born 1956) – musician, lead guitarist of R.E.M.
 Jamie Burke (born 1971) – former Major League Baseball catcher 
 Ty Burrell (born 1967) – actor
 Brian Burres (born 1981) – Major League Baseball pitcher for the Pittsburgh Pirates

C

 Bruce Campbell (born 1958) – actor
 Marion Eugene Carl (1915–1998) – United States Marine Corps fighter ace and record-setting test pilot
 Jean Carmen (1913–1993) – actress, pin-up model
 Margaret Carter (born 1935) – politician
 Raymond Carver (1938–1988) – author
 Erin Chambers (born 1979) – actress
 Jeff Charleston (born 1983) – former National Football League defensive end 
 Daveigh Chase (born 1990) – actress
Arthur Chin (1913–1997) – World War II flying ace
 Janet Chvatal (born 1964) – classical soprano, author and director of musicals 
 Adam Cimber (born 1990) – Major League Baseball pitcher for the Cleveland Indians
 Beverly Cleary (1916–2021) – author
 Kellen Clemens (born 1983) – National Football League quarterback for the San Diego Chargers
 Michelle Clunie (born 1969) – actress
 Pinto Colvig (1892–1967) – actor, voice actor 
 Thomas Condon (1822–1907) – minister, geologist, and paleontologist
Donald Cook (1901–1961) – actor
 Gretchen Corbett (born 1947) – actress
Henry L. Corbett (1881–1957) – businessman, civic leader, and politician
 Henry W. Corbett (1827–1903) – Oregon pioneer, businessman, politician, and philanthropist
 Robert O. Cornthwaite (1917–2006) – character actor, Picket Fences
Chad Cota (born 1971) – former National Football League player and co-owner of InfoStructure
Colby Covington (born 1988) – mixed martial artist
 Trevor Crowe (born 1983) – former Major League Baseball outfielder
 Ann Curry (born 1956) – television journalist

D

 Bernard Daly (1858–1920) – pioneer doctor, businessman, rancher, and politician
 George Dantzig (1914–2005) – mathematical scientist
 Ray (1900–1983) and Hugh DeAutremont (1900–1984) – criminals
 David DeCoteau (born 1962) – film director and producer
 Richard Diebenkorn (1922–1993) – artist
 Marie Aioe Dorion (ca. 1786–1850) – member of Pacific Fur Company expedition
 Sarah Dougher (born 1967) – musician
 Sho Dozono (born 1944) – businessman, candidate in 2008 Portland mayoral race
 Brandon Drury (born 1992) – second baseman for the Arizona Diamondbacks
 Patrick Duffy (born 1949) – actor
Mindy Duncan – beauty queen
Mike Dunleavy Jr. (born 1980) – basketball player for the Chicago Bulls
 Katherine Dunn (1945–2016) – writer
 James Dutton (born 1968) – astronaut

E

 Robert Eakin (1848–1917) – Oregon Supreme Court chief justice
 Randall Edwards (born 1961) – Oregon State Treasurer
 Chandler Egan (1884–1936) – golf course designer
 Mike Ekstrom (born 1983) – Major League Baseball pitcher for the Tampa Bay Rays
 Sam Elliott (born 1944) – actor
 LeRoy Ellis (1940–2012) – NBA basketball player
 Jacoby Ellsbury (born 1983) – Major League Baseball outfielder for the New York Yankees
 Harris Ellsworth (1899–1986) – member of U.S. Congress from Oregon
 Jeri Ellsworth (born 1974) – entrepreneur and autodidact computer chip designer
 Jack Ely (1943–2015) – musician of The Kingsmen
 Douglas Engelbart (1925–2013) – inventor and early computer pioneer
 Siegfried Engelmann (1931–2019) – educator
 Marie Equi (1872–1952) – physician and anarchist
 John R. Everett (1918–1992) – President of Hollins College, first Chancellor of the Municipal College System of the City of New York, and President of the New School for Social Research
 Neil Everett (born 1962) – ESPN sportscaster
 Tom Everett (born 1948) – actor
 Chris Eyre (born 1968) – film director and producer

F

 Tami Farrell (born 1984) – Miss Teen USA 2003
Rich Fellers (born 1959) – Olympic equestrian
 Mark Few (born 1962) – head men's basketball coach at Gonzaga University
 Todd Field (born 1964) – screenwriter, film director, actor
 David Fincher (born 1962) – film director
 Francis Fletcher (1814–1871) – British Oregon pioneer
 George Buck Flower (1937–2004) – actor
 Sally Flynn (born 1946) – singer
 Dick Fosbury (1947–2023) – track and field athlete; invented the "Fosbury Flop"
 Howie Fox (1921–1955) – Major League Baseball pitcher
 Harriet Frank Jr. (1923–2020) – screenwriter
 Nell Franzen (1889–1973) – actress
 Alex Frost (born 1987) – actor

G

 Clark Gable (1901–1960) – actor
 Maggie Gallagher (born 1960) – social conservative writer and commentator
 Richard Garfield (born 1963) – mathematician, inventor, and game designer
 Dan Gauthier (born 1963) – actor 
 Laura Gibson (born 1979) – singer-songwriter, musician
 Alfred Carlton Gilbert (1884–1961) – athlete, toy-maker and businessman; inventor of the Erector Set
 Karl Glusman (born 1988) – actor
 Neil Goldschmidt (born 1940) – influential and controversial Governor, Mayor of Portland, lobbyist
 Brandon Gonzáles (born 1984) – professional boxer
 Avel Gordly (born 1947) – first African American woman elected to the Oregon State Senate
 A.C. Green (born 1963) – NBA player
 Alex Green (born 1988) – National Football League running back for the Green Bay Packers
 Edith Green (1910–1987) – Oregon congresswoman and educator
 Scott Gragg (born 1972) – National Football League offensive tackle for the San Francisco 49ers and New York Jets
 Kevin Gregg (born 1978) – relief pitcher for the Baltimore Orioles
 Matt Groening (born 1954) – creator of The Simpsons
 Les Gutches (born 1973) – two-time world medalist and world champion in freestyle wrestling
 Jeremy Guthrie (born 1979) – Major League Baseball pitcher for the Kansas City Royals

H

 Kevin Hagen (1928–2005) – actor
 Page Hamilton (born 1960) – musician
 Bill Hanley (rancher) (1910–1935) – pioneer rancher and wildlife conservation advocate
 Kathleen Hanna (born 1968) – singer, songwriter
 Tonya Harding (born 1970) – ice skater, boxer
 Katie Harman (born 1980) – Miss America 2002
 Gregory Harrison (born 1950) – actor, Trapper John, M.D.
 Oscar Harstad (1892–1985) – Major League Baseball pitcher
 Taylor Hart (born 1991) – defensive end for the Philadelphia Eagles
 Mark Hatfield (1922–2011) – Oregon legislator, secretary of state, governor and U.S. senator
 Scott Hatteberg (born 1969) – former MLB first baseman and catcher
 John Haughm (born 1975) – vocalist and guitarist for folk metal band Agalloch
 Carey Hayes (born 1961) – screenwriter
 Chad Hayes (born 1961) – screenwriter
 Todd Haynes (born 1961) – director 
 Hazel P. Heath (1909–1998) – mayor, Homer, Alaska
 Jon Heder (born 1977) – actor
 Margaux Hemingway (1955–1996) – fashion model, actress and granddaughter of writer Ernest Hemingway
 Bobby Henderson – Pastafarian and prophet of the Church of the Flying Spaghetti Monster
 Justin Herbert (born 1998) – National Football League quarterback
 Howard Hesseman (born 1940) – actor, played disc jockey "Johnny Fever" on the television sitcom WKRP in Cincinnati
 Leah Hing (1907–2001) – pilot
 D.K. Holm (born 1953) – movie reviewer, Internet columnist, radio broadcaster, and author
 Herbert Hoover (1874–1964) – moved to Oregon at the age of eleven; 31st President of the United States (1929–1933)
 Nick Hundley (born 1983) – catcher for the Baltimore Orioles

I
 Terri Irwin (born 1964) – naturalist and conservationist (with husband Steve Irwin)
 Lucie Fulton Isaacs (1841-1916) — writer, philanthropist, suffragist; member, Oregon Pioneer Association

J

 Clifton James (1920–2017) – actor, best known for his roles as Sheriff J.W. Pepper alongside Roger Moore in two James Bond films
 Larry Jansen (1920–2009) – Major League Baseball pitcher and coach
 Margo Jennings (born 1945) – athletic coach
 Ethel Jewett (1877–1944) – actress
 Bill Johnson (1960–2016) – World Cup alpine ski racer
 June Jones (born 1953) – head football coach for Southern Methodist University
 Terrence Jones (born 1992) – basketball player for the Houston Rockets
 Chief Joseph (1840–1904) – chief of the Wal-lam-wat-kain (Wallowa) band of Nez Perce Native Americans

K
 Mat Kearney (born 1978) – musician
 Barnaby Keeney (1914–1980) – president of Brown University
 Scott Kelly (born 1967) – musician Neurosis
 Shell Kepler (1958–2008) – actress
 Maude Kerns (1876–1965) – avant-garde visual artist
 Ken Kesey (1935–2001) – author
 Kip Kinkel (born 1982) – school shooter
 Justin Kirk (born 1969) – actor
 John Kitzhaber (born 1947) – Oregon Governor (1995–2003, 2011–2015)
 Phil Knight (born 1938) – founder of Nike
 Tonya Knight (born 1966) – IFBB professional bodybuilder
 Travis Knight (born 1973) – director and producer, son of Phil Knight
 A. Thomas Kraabel (1934–2016) – classics scholar
 Jon Krakauer (born 1954) – author and mountaineer
 Nicholas Kristof (born 1959) – Pulitzer Prize-winning journalist 
 Taya Kyle (born 1974) – author, wife of Chris Kyle

L

 Winona LaDuke (born 1959) – Native American activist
 Alicia Lagano (born 1979) – actress 
 Ben Hur Lampman (1886–1954) – journalist, essayist, Poet Laureate 
 Frances Moore Lappé (born 1944) – author and activist
 Lars Larson (born 1959) – radio talk show host
 Ursula K. Le Guin (1929–2018) – author
 Barbara Coombs Lee (born 1947) – president of Compassion & Choices
 Hazel Ying Lee (1912–1944) – military pilot
 Marc Alan Lee (1978–2006) – first Navy SEAL to lose his life in Operation Iraqi Freedom
 Leonard Levy (1923–2006) – Pulitzer Prize winner
 Rian Lindell (born 1977) – NFL placekicker for the Buffalo Bills
 Matt Lindland (born 1970) – former MMA fighter, Olympic silver medalist in Greco-Roman wrestling
 Jon Lindstrom (born 1957) – actor, General Hospital, Port Charles
 Neil Lomax (born 1959) – NFL quarterback for St. Louis / Phoenix Cardinals
 Gary Loudermilk (born 1952) – radio personality, known as "Gary the Retard" in Howard Stern's Wack Pack 
 Courtney Love (born 1964) – musician, actress
 Kevin Love (born 1987) – NBA basketball player for the Cleveland Cavaliers
 Jed Lowrie (born 1984) – infielder for the Houston Astros

M

 Ranald MacDonald (1824–1894) – first man to teach the English language in Japan
 Holly Madison (born 1979) – former girlfriend of Playboy founder Hugh Hefner, model, television personality
 Dick Magruder (1946–1978) – rancher, lawyer, and politician
 Larry Mahan (born 1943) – six-time World All-Around Rodeo Champion cowboy
 Donald Malarkey (1921–2017) – World War II soldier 
 Bridget Marquardt (born 1973) – former girlfriend of Playboy founder Hugh Hefner, model, actress, television personality
 Richard Laurence Marquette (born 1934) – serial killer
 Jeron Mastrud (born 1987) – American football player
 David Mayo (born 1991) – American football player
 Lewis A. McArthur (1883–1951) – author of Oregon Geographic Names
 Tom McCall (1913–1983) – 30th Governor of Oregon
 David McCord (1897–1997) – poet
 Rose McGowan (born 1973) – actress 
 Dallas McKennon (1919–2009) – voice actor; voice of Gumby, Pokey, Archie Andrews, and Tony the Tiger
 Charles McNary (1874–1944) – U.S. senator, and 1940 republican U.S. vice presidential nominee
 Pat McQuistan (born 1983) – former NFL player (Dallas Cowboys, Miami Dolphins, New Orleans Saints, Arizona Cardinals, and Tennessee Titans)
 Paul McQuistan (born 1983) – former NFL player; 2013 Super Bowl winner with the Seattle Seahawks (also played with Oakland Raiders, Jacksonville Jaguars, and Cleveland Browns)
 Mayo Methot (1904–1951) – actress; third wife of Humphrey Bogart
 Charis Michelsen (born 1974) – actress and former model
 Quintin Mikell (born 1980) – safety for the Philadelphia Eagles
 Jourdan Miller (born 1993) – fashion model, America's Next Top Model winner
 Bob Mionske (born 1962) – attorney and former Olympic and professional bicycle racer
 Geoffrey Moore (born 1946) – high-technology consultant and author
 Joel Moore (born 1977) – actor
 Walt Morey (1907–1992) – author
 Lee Morse (1897–1954) – jazz and blues singer/songwriter, Broadway actress, and guitar player
 Macy Morse (1921–2019) – peace activist
 Ona Munson (1903–1955) – actress
 Dale Murphy (born 1956) – former Major League Baseball player
 Brent Musburger (born 1939) – CBS, ABC, ESPN sportscaster

N
 Legedu Naanee (born 1983) – National Football League wide receiver for the San Diego Chargers
 James Nesmith (1820–1885) – pioneer, lawyer, and politician 
 John Strong Newberry (1822–1892) – geologist, physician, explorer, and author
 Mickey Newbury  (1973-2002) – songwriter
 Chester Newton (1903–1966) – Olympic silver medalist in freestyle wrestling
 William A. Niskanen (1933–2011) – economist 
 Kim Novak (born 1933) – actress

O
 Austin O'Brien (born 1981) – actor
 Owamagbe Odighizuwa (born 1992) – defensive end for the New York Giants
 Jack Ohman (born 1960) – editorial cartoonist for The Oregonian
 Musse Olol – social activist
 Eric Christian Olsen (born 1977) – actor
 George Olsen (1893–1971) – drummer and prolific bandleader.
 Kaitlin Olson (born 1975) – actress
 Bethenia Angelina Owens-Adair (1840–1926) – activist, physician

P

 Bob Packwood (born 1932) – former United States Senate and Chairman of the Senate Finance Committee
 Bettie Page (1923–2008) – pin-up model
 Chuck Palahniuk (born 1961) – journalist, author
 Mark Parent (born 1961) – former Major League Baseball catcher
 Ken Patera (born 1943) – professional wrestler, Olympic weightlifter, and strongman competitor
 Chief Paulina (died 1867) – leader of the Hunipuitöka band of Northern Paiute Native Americans
 Linus Pauling (1901–1994) – chemist and activist; only person to win two Nobel Prizes outright
 Bill Pearl (born 1930) – world champion bodybuilder
 Alfred Peet (1920–2007) – founder of Peet's Coffee & Tea
 Kari Ann Peniche (born 1984) – actress
 Jack Pennick (1895–1964) – actor
 Tom Peterson (1930–2016) – home appliance retailer and television pitchman
 Kim M. Peyton-McDonald (1957–1986) – gold medalist from 1976 Summer Olympics; Oregon Sports Hall of Fame inductee
 Julianne Phillips (born 1960) – actress; ex-wife of Bruce Springsteen
 River Phoenix (1970–1993) – actor, musician, and activist 
 Mitch Pileggi (born 1952) – actor
 Henry Pittock (1835–1919) – pioneer; founder and publisher of The Oregonian 
 Bill Plympton (born 1946) – animator, graphic designer, and cartoonist
 Troy Polamalu (born 1981) – strong safety for the Pittsburgh Steelers
 Elias Porter (1914–1987) – psychologist
 Norris Poulson (1895–1982) – 36th mayor of Los Angeles
 Jane Powell (born 1929) – actress
 Steve Prefontaine (1951–1975) – track athlete 
 Megan Prelinger (born 1967) – cultural historian, archivist
 Maudie Prickett (1914–1976) – actress

R

 Ruth Radelet (born 1982) – musician, lead singer of Chromatics
 Ahmad Rashad (born 1949) – college and National Football League player and sportscaster
 Johnnie Ray (1927–1990) – singer, songwriter
 Susan Raye (born 1944) – country singer
 John Reed (1887–1920) – journalist and Bolshevik activist
 Robin Reed (1899–1978) – Olympic gold medalist in freestyle wrestling
 Holiday Reinhorn (born 1967) – fiction writer; married to actor Rainn Wilson
 Mike Remmers (born 1989) – offensive tackle for the New York Giants
 Harold Reynolds (born 1960) – Major League Baseball player; television analyst
 Kim Rhodes (born 1969) – actress and singer
 Mike Rich (born 1959) – screenwriter
 Anna Rankin Riggs (1835-1908) – social reformer
 Jenelle Riley (born 1972) – journalist, screenwriter
 Mike Riley (born 1953) – football player for Alabama Crimson Tide and Nebraska Cornhuskers head coach
 Lisa Rinna (born 1963) – actress 
 Terry Robb (born 1956) – fingerstyle guitarist
Cathy McMorris Rodgers (born 1969) – U.S. Representative, Chair of the House Republican Conference
 Dante Rosario (born 1984) – tight end for the Chicago Bears
 Terrence Ross (born 1991) – NBA player for the Toronto Raptors
 Zac Rosscup (born 1988) – pitcher for the Chicago Cubs
 Mark Rothko (1903–1970) – Latvian expressionist artist 
 Aaron Rowand (born 1977) – MLB player for San Francisco Giants and Chicago White Sox
Nico Rudu (born 1998) – singer-songwriter, musician, rapper
 Burt Rutan (born 1943) – aerospace engineer
 Ad Rutschman (born 1931) – football and baseball coach at Linfield College
 Susan Ruttan (born 1948) – actress

S

 Domantas Sabonis (born 1996) – player for the Indiana Pacers
 Mendel Sachs (1927–2012) – theoretical physicist
 Katee Sackhoff (born 1980) – actress
 Curtis Salgado (born 1954) – blues, rhythm and blues, and soul singer and harmonica player
 Rick Sanders (1945–1972) – two-time Olympic silver medalist in freestyle wrestling
 Rebecca Schaeffer (1967–1989) – actress
 Shoni Schimmel (born 1992) – WNBA player with the Atlanta Dream
 Les Schwab (1917–2007) – businessman
 Dale Scott (born 1959) – Major League Baseball umpire
 Daniel Seavey (born 1999) – musician, singer-songwriter, and contestant on American Idol season 14
 Doc Severinsen (born 1927) – trumpeter, bandleader on The Tonight Show
 Kyle Singler (born 1988) – small forward for the Oklahoma City Thunder
 Sonny Sixkiller – former Washington Huskies quarterback; actor
 Alek Skarlatos (born 1992) – Oregon Army National Guardsman specialist known for stopping a gunman in a Paris-bound train from Amsterdam via Brussels; contestant on Dancing with the Stars season 21
 Matt Slauson (born 1986) – guard for the Chicago Bears
 Bill Smith (1928–2018) – Olympic gold medalist in freestyle wrestling
 Dean Smith (1899–1987) – pioneer pilot
 Elliott Smith (1969–2003) – musician
 Chael Sonnen (born 1977) – mixed martial artist, competed in the UFC
 Esperanza Spalding (born 1984) – jazz musician
 Erik Spoelstra (born 1970) – head coach for the Miami Heat
 Mary Jane Spurlin (1883–1970) – Oregon's first woman judge
 Ralph Stackpole (1885–1973) – visual artist
 Colleen Stan (born 1956) – kidnapping victim, activist
 William Gladstone Steel (1883–1934) – conservationist, known as the "father of Crater Lake"
Dorothy Hester Stenzel (1910–1991) – record-breaking stunt pilot
 Ryan Stevenson (born 1979) – musician 
 David Ogden Stiers (1942–2018) – actor
 Eric A. Stillwell (born 1962) – screenwriter and producer
 Kimberley Strassel (born 1972) – author, member of The Wall Street Journal editorial board
 Robert W. Straub (1920–2002) – Governor of Oregon
 Brenda Strong (born 1960) – actress 
 Sally Struthers (born 1948) – actress 
 Drew Struzan (born 1947) – artist
 Ndamukong Suh (born 1987) – defensive tackle for the Los Angeles Rams
 William L. Sullivan (born 1953) – author of outdoor guide books

T

 Jack Tafari (1946–2016) – housing-rights activist
 Ruth Taylor (1905–1984) – actress
 Maria Thayer (born 1975) – actress
 Tommy Thayer (born 1960) – musician, lead guitarist of Kiss
 Inga Thompson (born 1968) – professional bicycle racer
 Andy Tillman (born 1952) – llama rancher, businessman, and author
 Barrett Tillman (born 1948) – novelist and military historian
 Kevin Towers (1961–2018) – general manager for the Arizona Diamondbacks
 April Genevieve Tucholke – young adult novelist
 Corin Tucker (born 1972) – musician, guitarist

U
 Ime Udoka (born 1977) – small forward for the San Antonio Spurs
 Sara Jean Underwood (born 1984) – Playboy Playmate of the Year 2007, model, actress

V
 Richard VanGrunsven (born 1939) – homebuilt aircraft designer 
 Gus Van Sant (born 1952) – director
 Paige VanZant (born 1994) – mixed martial artist
 Laura Veirs (born 1973) – folk singer-songwriter
 Will Vinton (1947–2018) – director and producer

W

 Lindsay Wagner (born 1949) – actress
 Don Wakamatsu (born 1963) – bench coach for the Kansas City Royals
 Neale Donald Walsch (born 1943) – author 
 Don Walsh (born 1931) – oceanographer, explorer 
 Bill Warren (1943–2016) – film historian
 Craig Wasson (born 1954) – actor 
 Michael Waterman (born 1942) – scientist
 Dominic Waters (born 1986) – basketball player in the Israel Basketball Premier League
 Connor Weil (born 1994) – actor
 Bob Welch – author and columnist
 John West (1809–1888) – Scottish captain and inventor
 Oswald West (1873–1960) – 14th Governor of Oregon
 Opal Whiteley (1897–1992) – nature writer and diarist
 Dave Wiegand – winner of 2005 and 2009 National Scrabble championship
 Carl Wieman (born 1951) – physicist, winner of 2001 Nobel Prize in Physics laureate
 Dave Wilcox (born 1942) – Hall of Fame linebacker with the San Francisco 49ers
 Edy Williams (born 1942) – film and television actress
 Mitch Williams (born 1964) – Major League Baseball relief pitcher, studio analyst for MLB Network
 Bridgette Wilson (born 1973) – actress, singer and model
 Nancy Wilson (born 1954) – musician, Heart
 Kyle Wiltjer (born 1992) – player for the Houston Rockets
 Henry Hope Wong (1900–?) – pioneer pilot
 Basil Wolverton (1909–1978) – cartoonist, writer
 Renn Woods (born 1958) – actress 
 Anthony Wynn (born 1962) – author

Y 
 Minoru Yasui (1916–1986) – lawyer and civil rights activist
 Yeat (born 2000) – rapper

Z
 John Zerzan (born 1943) – anthropologist and anarchist writer

See also 

By city

 List of people from Bend, Oregon
 List of people from Eugene, Oregon
 List of people from Hillsboro, Oregon
 List of people from Portland, Oregon

By public office

 List of governors of Oregon
 List of Oregon judges
 List of presidents of the Oregon State Senate
 List of speakers of the Oregon House of Representatives
 List of United States representatives from Oregon
 List of United States senators from Oregon

By educational institution affiliation

 List of Oregon State University alumni
 List of Oregon State University faculty and staff
 List of Reed College people
 List of University of Oregon alumni
 List of University of Oregon faculty and staff
 List of Willamette University alumni

References